HC Karpaty Uzhgorod  is a women's handball club from Uzhhorod in Ukraine. HC Karpaty competes in the Ukrainian Superleague.

Honours 
 Superleague
 Winners (3) : 2012, 2013, 2014

European record

Team

Current squad 
Squad for the 2016–17 season

Goalkeepers
 Iryna Iablonska-Bobal
 Kateryna Shelamova
 Ielizaveta Voronko

Wingers
RW
  Oleksandra Furmanets
  Viktoriya Hychka
  Nataliya Petrovska
LW 
  Yana Hotra
  Tetiana Kylch
Line Players 
  Yevheniia Bilyk
  Anastasiya Melekestseva
  Anastasiya Popovych

Back players
LB
  Irina Dronova
  Anastasiya Petrovska
CB 
  Anna Lezinska
  Nataliia Shypliak 
RB
  Iryna Kompaniiets 
  Kateryna Kupchak 
  Olha Sukhetska

External links
 
 EHF Club profile

Ukrainian handball clubs
Sport in Uzhhorod
Handball clubs established in 1969
1969 establishments in Ukraine